NGP VAN, Inc. is an American privately owned voter database and web hosting service provider used by the Democratic Party, Democratic campaigns, and other non-profit organizations authorized by the Democratic Party. The platform or service is used by political and social campaigns for fundraising, campaign finance compliance, field organizing, and digital organizing. NGP VAN, Inc. was formerly known as Voter Activation Network, Inc. and changed its name to NGP VAN, Inc. in January 2011. The company was founded in 2001 and is based in Washington, D.C., with an additional location in Somerville, Massachusetts.

In 2009, the company was the largest partisan provider of campaign compliance software, used by most Democratic members of Congress. The company's services have been utilized by clients such as the Obama 2008 presidential campaign, the Obama 2012 presidential campaign, the Hillary Rodham Clinton 2016 presidential campaign, the Bernie Sanders 2016 presidential campaign, the British Liberal Democrats, and the Liberal Party of Canada.

History
NGP VAN was created in November 2010 by the merger of its two predecessor companies: NGP Software (founded in 1997 by Nathaniel Pearlman, who later served as chief technology officer for Hillary Clinton's 2008 presidential campaign, in his attic in Washington, DC), and Voter Activation Network (founded in 2001 by Mark Sullivan, in his study in Cambridge, Massachusetts).

In October 2014, NGP VAN launched their EveryAction fundraising management platform for non-profits.

There are occasional accusations that the Democratic Party has restricted access to Votebuilder to hold off a challenge to an incumbent office holder in a primary. For example, Rachel Ventura, running against an incumbent Democrat in IL-11, was told "I've heard from our Executive Director. Your request for Votebuilder for Illinois' 11th Congressional District through the Democratic Party of Illinois has been denied due to our regulations that we don't issue subscriptions to candidates challenging an incumbent."

In 2019, the company made three acquisitions; ActionKit, BSD Kit from Blue State Digital, and DonorTrends.

In 2021, NGP VAN's parent company, EveryAction, Inc., was acquired by London-based private equity firm Apax Partners. The company also named Amanda Coulombe President of NGP VAN.

Products
MiniVAN – A mobile canvassing application that allows for campaigns and organizations to contact voters or supporters, collect data, and sync the information back to their VAN or EveryAction database in real time. 71% of progressive voter contact attempts were made on MiniVAN instead of paper lists in 2018.

VoteBuilder – A web-based service used by the Democratic Party and associated campaigns to track interactions with potential voters. Votebuilder stores information like phone calls and other methods of contact with voters in the system. It is used as part of campaign voter persuasion and "get out the vote" operations. The software was created in 2006 to bridge a perceived gap in microtargeting abilities between the Republican and Democratic parties.

On Wednesday, December 16, 2015, NGP VAN released a code update to their Votebuilder application which contained a bug that allowed two campaigns to see proprietary analytical scores. On the evening of Thursday, December 17 the DNC revoked the Sanders campaign's access to the national voter file, after the campaign accessed and saved data collected by the Clinton campaign. The Sanders campaign sued the DNC in District Court and concurrently fired Josh Uretsky, the staffer who managed three other members of the Sanders campaign who improperly accessed the data. On December 19, the DNC restored the Sanders campaign's access after the campaign agreed to cooperate with their investigation.

NGP – A web-based service for digital engagement, fundraising, and compliance reporting used by most federal Democratic campaigns. NGP is also used by state legislatures and local campaigns. In August 2017, the company released NGP 8, an updated version of the service.

Innovation Platform – A series of APIs and integrations that was rolled out in 2014. Several notable integrations include apps and services such as self-serve online advertising, broadcast and peer-to-peer text messaging tools, live calls, and do-it-yourself direct mail.

Mobilize – A web-based service for event management and volunteer recruitment that connects campaigns with supporters. Mobilize emerged from the 2016 election and grew to become a vital piece of Democratic and progressive tech infrastructure, before being acquired in 2021.

References

External links
 NGP VAN

Political software
Privately held companies based in Washington, D.C.
Software companies based in Massachusetts
Software companies of the United States
Software companies based in Washington, D.C.
Voter databases
Web design companies
2021 mergers and acquisitions